Patrick Blanchfield  (18 December 1911 – 20 June 1980) was a Labour Party member of the New Zealand Parliament for Westland and the West Coast.

Biography

Early life and career
Blanchfield was born in 1911 in Greymouth where his father, Patrick, owned a bakery. He was educated at Marist Brothers' Primary School where he won the Seddon Medal for being the school districts top scholar. He received secondary schooling at St Bede's College, Christchurch. Despite receiving a formal education Blanchfield still stuck to the "self-taught tradition" of other West Coasters and educated himself further on his favourite subjects, those of literature and poetry. He was also to compose his own poetry which were compiled in the 1971 book The Ballads of a Coaster.

In 1938 he married Anne Jane Glen Faulkner. He joined his father in the baking business and remained attached to the business until his election to Parliament, where his son took over the shop.

He had a lifetime interest in Harness racing. He owned his own horse at one stage, One Stately Lady, though it only won a race once. The horse did become the subject of one Blanchfield's most notable poems. Blanchfield was also a commentator on the West Coast racing circuit for many years.

Political career

Blanchfield was elected as a member of the Greymouth Borough Council via a by-election in 1937, aged only 21. He remained a member of the council until 1941 when he unsuccessfully stood for the mayoralty. That same year however he was successful in winning a seat on the Grey Power Board. He was a member of the Power Board for 21 years, including two as chairman. In 1947 he put himself forward as a candidate for the Labour Party nomination for the Westland electorate at a by-election. Though he was unsuccessful with Jim Kent ultimately being selected. In 1953 he returned to the Borough Council "topping the poll" and was a member until 1962 when he chose not to stand for re-election. Additionally, he was a member of the Westland catchment Board from 1968 to 1971.

In 1960 Kent retired from parliament and Blanchfield succeeded him, representing the Westland electorate from 1960 to 1972, and then the West Coast electorate from 1972 to 1978, when he retired. He had health problems during this time and in 1967 had a lung removed. In 1977 he was hospitalized for some time under an Oxygen tent. Both incidents induced Blanchfield to retire at the 1978 general election.

He was famous for his elaborate style of oration and habit of quoting his favourite authors (including William Shakespeare, Robbie Burns, John Milton and Thomas Gray) in speeches to Parliament. The most well known occasion was whilst debating an education bill when he quoted a long passage from Elegy Written in a Country Churchyard, to which the Speaker Sir Ronald Algie asked what was the purpose of the quote. Blanchfield responded that "What is happening is exactly the same as in Gray's time when the poor could not get an education". Algie's face slumped into his hands, however he allowed Blanchfield to continue.

In 1977, Blanchfield was awarded the Queen Elizabeth II Silver Jubilee Medal. In the 1978 Queen's Birthday Honours, he was appointed a Member of the Order of the British Empire, for services to the community.

Later life and death
Upon retiring from politics Blanchfield became the patron of West Coast Rugby League.

He had been suffering from a lung ailment and respiratory disease for several years prior. Before his death he had voluntarily spent a month in hospital, where he spent his time writing copious notes in preparation for writing a memoir, before being discharged. A week later he was readmitted. Blanchfield died in Greymouth on 20 June 1980, aged 68. He was survived by his wife, four sons and seven daughters.

Notes

References

1911 births
1980 deaths
People educated at St Bede's College, Christchurch
Local politicians in New Zealand
New Zealand Members of the Order of the British Empire
New Zealand Labour Party MPs
Members of the New Zealand House of Representatives
New Zealand MPs for South Island electorates
20th-century New Zealand poets
20th-century New Zealand male writers
New Zealand male poets
People from Greymouth
20th-century New Zealand politicians
People educated at John Paul II High School, Greymouth